KTP or KTp may refer to:
 Kappa Theta Pi
 Karl Parker (1895–1992), British art historian
 Kartu Tanda Penduduk, the Indonesian identity card
 Kissing the Pink
 Kitchen table polyamory, a style of polyamory
 Knowledge Transfer Partnerships
 Kommunistinen Työväenpuolue – Rauhan ja Sosialismin puolesta, a communist party in Finland
 Kotkan Työväen Palloilijat, Finnish football club
 Kristian Thalai Pâwl, an organisation of the Mizoram Presbyterian Church Synod
 Potassium trispyrazolylborate, a chemical compound
 Potassium titanyl phosphate, an inorganic crystal

See also
 FC KooTeePee